Project 97 icebreakers and their derivatives are a diverse series of diesel-electric icebreakers and other icebreaking vessels built in the Soviet Union. In total, 32 vessels were built in various configurations for both civilian and naval service in the 1960s, 1970s and early 1980s, and several remain in service in Russia .

Background and construction 
In the mid-1950s, the Soviet Union began developing a new diesel-electric icebreaker design that could meet the needs of both civilian and naval operators. At the time, the merchant marine relied largely on ageing steam-powered icebreakers, many of which had been built during the Imperial Russia era and would reach the end of their operational life in the coming years. In addition, the Soviet Border Troops possessed just one ice-capable vessel for patrolling the country's northern border, Project 52 Purga, which had been laid down already in 1938 but did not enter service until 1957.

Technical development of the new icebreakers was entrusted to Leningrad-based Central Design Bureau No. 15, today known as Central Design Bureau "Iceberg" and part of the state-owned United Shipbuilding Corporation, which based the hull lines on the Swedish-built steam-powered icebreaker Eisbär which Germany had handed over to the Soviet Union as war reparations in 1946. Discussions during technical meetings sometimes became heated as naval architects tried to include both civilian and naval requirements into the design. One of the sources of disagreement was the bow propeller which was considered essential for icebreaking operations in the Baltic Sea and other non-Arctic waters but susceptible to damage in heavier Arctic ice conditions.

Once the final design had been developed, the construction of the Project 97 icebreakers and their derivatives was awarded to the Leningrad-based Admiralty Shipyard. The construction of the first series, which consisted of largely similar triple-screw icebreakers, proceeded at a rapid rate: the hulls were assembled side by side on the slipway and launched at a technical readiness of 60 to 80 %. In 1960–1971, the shipyard delivered up to three vessels annually, often in different configurations, while simultaneously implementing various technical improvements devised during the operation of the first vessels of the series. The second series with twin-screw eight Project 97P patrol vessels and one Project 97N research vessel was built in 1973–1981.

With a total of 32 vessels built in various configurations over more than two decades, Project 97 is the largest and longest-running class of icebreakers and icebreaking vessels built in the world. With the exception of nuclear-powered icebreakers, they were also the only domestically-built post-war icebreaking vessels in the Soviet Union and later Russia until the construction of Project 21900 icebreakers in the late 2000s.

General characteristics 
The hull form, derived from an older Swedish-built icebreaker, featured a round midship with pronounced tumblehome and practically no flat bottom or sides. While the curved hull lines resulted in low resistance and high maneuverability in ice, the vessels were very uncomfortable in open water due to excessive rolling.

Both twin- and triple-screw Project 97 variants shared the same diesel-electric power plant with three direct current (DC) main diesel generators. The  10-cylinder 13D100 two-stroke opposed-piston main diesel engines were in fact reverse-engineered Fairbanks Morse 38 8-1/8 diesel engines manufactured by the Malyshev Factory in the Ukrainian Soviet Socialist Republic. The engines were coupled to double-armature DC generators (2 × 625 ) that provided power to  electric propulsion motors driving two  fixed pitch propellers in the stern and, on variants with a third propeller, a  electric motor driving a  propeller in the bow.

However, the later twin-screw variants were expected to have slightly lower icebreaking capability.

Icebreakers

Project 97 
Three Project 97 icebreakers were built for the Soviet Navy: Dobrynya Nikitich for the Northern Fleet, Purga for the Baltic Fleet, and Vyuga for the Pacific Fleet. While initially armed with 57 mm and 25 mm deck guns, the vessels were later disarmed.

Project 97А 
The series of unarmed icebreakers built for the Ministry of the Maritime Fleet of the Soviet Union, Project 97A, is the most numerous variant of the Project 97 family with twelve vessels built between 1961 and 1971. While initially named simply Ledokol followed by a running number, in 1966 they were given individual names to honor famous Imperial Russian and Soviet polar explorers.

, three Project 97A icebreakers remain in service with Rosmorport's North-Western Basin Branch in the Baltic Sea: Ivan Kruzenstern, Yuriy Lisyanskiy, and Semyon Dezhnev.

Project 97K 
Two unarmed Project 97A icebreakers built for the Soviet Navy, Ilya Muromets for the Pacific Fleet and Buran for the Baltic Fleet, are sometimes considered as a separate subclass, Project 97K.

, Buran remains in service with the Baltic Fleet.

Project 97E 
Project 97E was an unarmed icebreaker variant built for East Germany. The vessel, was operated by the state-owned shipping company Bagger-, Bugsier- und Bergungsreederei Rostock (BBB) until the German reunification in 1990 and Wasser- und Schifffahrtsamt Stralsund until its decommissioning in 2005.

In 2005, the decommissioned Stephan Jantzen was sold by the German state in an online auction to Beta Mar Limited, a shipping company registered in Greece, for 430,000 euro and renamed Stephan. However, the buyer forfeited the 40,000 euro downpayment and never collected the vessel. In the following years, the vessel changed owners, flags and names several times without ever leaving Rostock while plans to convert the old icebreaker into a luxury yacht were first presented and then abandoned. Finally the vessel, confiscated due to outstanding debts from berth and security fees, was acquired by the City of Rostock in 2018 and returned to the care of the non-profit organization which had looked after it until 2012. After extensive clean-up and renovations, the vessel was opened to the public as a museum ship.

Patrol vessels

Project 97AP 

Project 97AP was an armed patrol icebreaker variant built for the Soviet Navy. Built with increased autonomy time and operating range, they were intended to patrol the western and eastern ends of the Northern Sea Route. The armament was later dismantled.

Peresvet, which was previously assigned to the Northern Fleet, was decommissioned in 2011 and later scrapped. Sadko, assigned to the Pacific Fleet, was expended as target during the Umka-2022 military drills in September 2022.

Project 97P 

Project 97P was developed as a response to the renewed interest of the Soviet Navy and KGB Border Troops on icebreaking patrol vessels after United States Coast Guard and Canadian Coast Guard icebreakers began appearing more frequently near the country's northern maritime borders. New icebreaking patrol vessels were needed because existing Soviet naval vessels could not operate in ice-covered waters and large icebreakers, in addition to being unarmed and operated by civilians, could not be distracted from their primary mission of escorting merchant ships.

Project 97 was selected as the design basis following positive operational experience and the difficulties associated with developing a new design. The Project 97P design, developed by Central Design Bureau "Iceberg", was slightly longer than the preceding icebreakers, lacked the damage-prone bow propeller, and featured a bigger deckhouse built of aluminum-magnesium alloy to reduce weight. A helideck capable of receiving a Kamov Ka-25 or Ka-27 helicopter was fitted over the aft deck. The armament consisted of a twin 76 mm AK-726 deck gun and two 30 mm AK-630 close-in weapon systems.

, four Project 97P patrol ships remain in service: Ivan Susanin with the Pacific Fleet and Ruslan with the Northern Fleet, both with their armaments removed, and Neva and Volga with the FSB Border Service.

Other variants

Project 97D 
Project 97D was a hydrographic survey vessel variant built for the Ministry of the Maritime Fleet of the Soviet Union to survey the Northern Sea Route. While otherwise nearly identical to baseline Project 97 icebreakers, these two vessels were fitted with additional scientific facilities, echosounders to conduct hydrographic survey, and accommodation for an additional 14 personnel. However, they were also used for icebreaking operations from time to time.

Project 97B 

Project 97B was a hydrographic survey vessel variant built for the Hydrographic Office of the Soviet Navy. Unlike the preceding Project 97D built for civilian service, Project 97B was a more radical departure from the original Project 97 icebreaker design with increased length and displacement to increase range and endurance, as well as an enlarged deckhouse to accommodate more personnel on board.

, Vladimir Kavrayskiy remains in service with the Northern Fleet as the stationary barracks ship PKZ-86 in Murmansk.

Project 97N 

Project 97N, the final variant developed based on the Project 97 icebreaker design, was a research vessel commissioned by the State Committee for Hydrometeorology and Environmental Control of the Soviet Union to conduct scientific research in the poorly-studied transition zone between open water and the polar ice pack. In addition to adding extensive scientific facilities and additional accommodation space, the hull lines were given more pronounced sheer and flare to reduce the likelihood of waves breaking over the bow. The problematic rolling behavior was also addressed by increasing the rolling period from 7 to 9–10 seconds with design modifications and introducing a passive roll-reduction tank.

The only Project 97N ship, Otto Schmidt, entered service in 1979. In 1991, shortly after completing its 40th scientific voyage, the vessel was laid up in Murmansk due to lack of funding. Five years later, Otto Schmidt was sold to a private company and sailed on 8 August 1996 to Alang, India, for scrapping.

References

Bibliography
 

Icebreakers of the Soviet Union
Icebreakers of Russia
Ships built at Admiralty Shipyard
Auxiliary icebreaker classes